was a Shōwa era Kyoto-trained Japanese intellectual, and teacher.   Some identify strands of Marxism in his later philosophy. His criticisms of governments and their war policies caused him to end up in prison on various occasions.

Life
Jun Tosaka was born in Tokyo in 1900.  Due to his mother's illness and his father's early death he was moved that same year with his nurse to live with his grandparents in the Ishikawa Prefecture on the western side of the country.   In September 1905 he returned to Tokyo where he grew up with his mother in the city's Kanda quarter (today part of Chiyoda).

He attended Kyoto Imperial University. He was interested in the works of Nishida Kitaro, and Tanabe Hajime, neo-Kantianism, and then Marxism. He was a member of the Kyoto School. In 1938, he was arrested under the Peace Preservation Law. He died in Nagano Prison before the end of World War II.

References

Further reading

External links

Japanese philosophers
Japanese Marxists
1900 births
1945 deaths
Prisoners who died in Japanese detention
People from Tokyo
20th-century Japanese philosophers
Japanese people who died in prison custody